The Höhberghorn is a mountain of the Lepontine Alps, located west of Hinterrhein in the canton of Graubünden. On its eastern flank lies a glacier named Höhberggletscher.

References

External links
 Höhberghorn on Hikr

Mountains of the Alps
Alpine three-thousanders
Mountains of Switzerland
Mountains of Graubünden
Lepontine Alps
Rheinwald